Crodo is a comune (municipality) in the Province of Verbano-Cusio-Ossola in the Italian region Piedmont, located about  northeast of Turin and about  northwest of Verbania.

The municipality of Crodo contains the frazioni (subdivisions, mainly villages and hamlets) Alpiano, Rencio, Molinetto, Salecchio (o Bagni), Cravegna, Vegno, Emo, Mozzio, Viceno, Mondei, Rovallo, Cuga, Foppiano, Quategno, Braccio, Maglioggio, Prepiana, Garina.

Crodo borders the following municipalities: Baceno, Crevoladossola, Montecrestese, Premia, Varzo.

Geography 

In the district Foppiano of Crodo there's a woodland that is famous for the many boulders that were found among the trees. 
In fact the area is a notorious climbing spot among bouldering climbers and the boulder "Sass Fendù" has become a symbol of this place. The valley is known for climbing since the late 90s mostly because of the many gathering and competitions that have been arranged there.

Demographic evolution

References

External links
 www.comune.crodo.vb.it/

Cities and towns in Piedmont